The Šventoji or Latvian Sventāja is a river in the northwest of Lithuania and southwest of Latvia. It begins in Skuodas district and for 30 km flows on the international border between Latvia and Lithuania. The Šventoji flows into the Baltic Sea near Šventoji settlement north of Palanga. Būtingė oil terminal lies near the mouth.

International rivers of Europe
Rivers of Lithuania
Rivers of Latvia
Latvia–Lithuania border
Drainage basins of the Baltic Sea